Millerstown is an unincorporated community in Grayson County, Kentucky, in the United States.

History
Millerstown was incorporated in 1825. A post office was established at Millerstown in 1828, and remained in operation until it was discontinued in 1966.

References

Unincorporated communities in Grayson County, Kentucky
Unincorporated communities in Kentucky